The 2015 season was Hammarby Fotboll's 100th in existence, and their 46th season in Allsvenskan. It was Hammarby's first season in Allsvenskan after spending 5 seasons in the Superettan. They competed in Allsvenskan and the Svenska Cupen during the season.  Nanne Bergstrand returned to the team as his second season being manager. Gameplay for Hammarby in Svenska Cupen began on February 21, 2015, and ended on March 15, 2015.
Gameplay for Hammarby in Allsvenskan began on April 4, 2015, and ended on October 31, 2015.

Players

Squad Info

Note: This list includes all the players who played for Hammarby during the season.

Transfers

In

Out

Player statistics
Includes all players who partook in the 2015 Hammarby Season. Appearances for competitive matches only

|}

Disciplinary record

Club

Coaching staff

Other information

Pre-season and friendlies

Friendlies

Competitions

Overall

Allsvenskan

League table

Results summary

Results by round

Matches
Kickoff times are in UTC+2 unless stated otherwise.

Svenska Cupen

2014–15
The tournament continued from the 2014 season.

Kickoff times are in UTC+1.

Group stage

Knockout stage

2015–16
The tournament continued into the 2016 season.

Footnotes

Hammarby Fotboll seasons
Hammarby Fotboll